West Camel is a village and civil parish in south Somerset, England, about  north of the town of Yeovil. It lies either side of the River Cam, just south of the A303, and has a population of 459. The parish includes the hamlet of Urgashay. Neighbouring villages include Queen Camel, and Bridgehampton.

History
The name "Camel" derives not from the animal, but from the name "Cantmeel", "Cantmell" or "Cantmel", by which West Camel was formerly known. "Cantmeel" itself derives from the words cant (ridge) and mael (bare). The village was also known as Camel Abbatis for its association with Muchelney Abbey.

This is one of many sites in England identified as a possible setting of The Strife of Camlann, related as the final battle of King Arthur.

The earliest evidence of a settlement dates from before AD 940: remains of a Saxon preaching cross. The parish of West Camel later became part of the Hundred of Somerton.

The earliest written reference to West Camel dates from 995 CE, in the form of a grant of the village by Aethelred II to the monks of Muchelney Abbey. Produce exacted for the abbey grange was held in an extant 15th-century tithe barn.

earthworks 100 and 250 metres north of Downhead Manor Farm show the early site of houses, possibly including a manor house, tracks and a fish pond. Though it had existed since before the Norman conquest, this settlement had been abandoned by the late 18th century.

Running through West Camel is the Leland Trail, a  footpath that follows in the footsteps of John Leland, as he traversed across South Somerset in 1535–1543, during his investigations of the district's antiquities. The Leland Trail begins at King Alfred's Tower on the Wiltshire/Somerset border and ends at Ham Hill Country Park.

Governance
The parish council has responsibility for local issues, including setting an annual precept (local rate) to cover the council's operating costs and producing annual accounts for public scrutiny. As elsewhere, the parish council evaluates local planning applications and works with the local police, district council officers, and neighbourhood watch groups on crime, security, and traffic. Its role also includes initiating projects for maintaining and repairing parish facilities, and consulting with the district council on the maintenance, repair and improvement of highways, drainage, footpaths, public transport and street cleaning. Conservation matters (including trees and listed buildings) and environmental issues are also within its responsibility.

The village falls within the Non-metropolitan district of South Somerset, formed on 1 April 1974 under the Local Government Act 1972. It had hitherto belonged to Yeovil Rural District. The district council controls local planning and building, local roads, council housing, environmental health, markets and fairs, refuse collection and recycling, cemeteries and crematoria, leisure services, parks, and tourism. West Camel belongs to the electoral ward of Camelot.

Somerset County Council is responsible for running the most expensive local services, such as education, social services, libraries, main roads, public transport, policing and  fire services, trading standards, waste disposal and strategic planning.

The village belongs to the Somerton and Frome county constituency represented in the House of Commons. It elects one Member of Parliament (MP) by the first-past-the-post system of election.

Religious sites
The Church of All Saints dates from the late 14th century. It is a Grade I listed building. Its rectory dates from the early 15th century. The older wing may form part of the Grange pertaining to Muchelney Abbey; the south wing was probably added by Rev. Henry Law between 1824 and 1836.

Notable residents
Richard Amerike (c. 1445–1503) was a wealthy English born merchant, Royal customs officer and Sheriff of Welsh descent. He was principal owner of John Cabot's ship Matthew during a voyage of exploration to North America in 1497.
Elizabeth Benger (1775–1827), poet, novelist, and biographer of Anne Boleyn, was baptised here on 15 June 1775.

References

External links

http://www.westcamel.org.uk/
Somerset County Council
www.nationalarchives.gov.uk/ - archive reference Anglo-Saxon charter: Aethelred II to Muchelney Abbey:

Villages in South Somerset
Civil parishes in Somerset